The Saloum River rises about 105 kilometers east of Kaolack, Senegal, and flows into the Atlantic Ocean. The significant Saloum Delta is located at its mouth, which is protected as Saloum Delta National Park. The river basin lies within the Serer pre-colonial Kingdom of Saloum.
Mangrove forests occupy a 5-kilometer belt on either side of the river almost 70 kilometers upstream.

See also
Sine River
Sine-Saloum
Kingdom of Saloum

References
 A Directory of African Wetlands. Robert Mepham, R. H. Hughes, G. M. Bernacsek, International Union for Conservation of Nature and Natural Resources, United Nations Environment Programme, World Conservation Monitoring Centre, 1992.

Rivers of Senegal
Serer country